Bernhard Casper (24 April 1931 – 8 June 2022) was a German philosopher.

Biography
Born in Trier in 1931, Casper passed his Abitur in Aschaffenburg in 1949. From 1979 to 2000, he taught Christian philosophy at the University of Freiburg. He was a Roman Catholic priest in the Diocese of Würzburg and lived in Wittnau, Baden-Württemberg. In 1995, he earned an honorary doctorate from the Institut Catholique de Paris. In 2012, he was named a citizen of honor of Travagliato.

Bernhard Casper died in Wittnau on 8 June 2022 at the age of 91.

Publications
Das Dialogische Denken. Franz Rosenzweig, Ferdinand Ebner und Martin Buber (1967)
Feuerbach, Marx, Freud (1974)
Phänomenologie des Idols (1981)
Gott nennen. Phänomenologische Zugänge (1981)
Alltag und Transzendenz. Studien zur religiösen Erfahrung in der gegenwärtigen Gesellschaft (1992)
Das Ereignis des Betens. Grundlinien einer Hermeneutik des religiösen Geschehens (1998)
Angesichts des Anderen. Emmanuel Levinas – Elemente seines Denkens (2009)
Grundfragen des Humanen. Studien zur Menschlichkeit des Menschen (2014)
„Geisel für den Anderen – vielleicht nur ein harter Name für Liebe“. Emmanuel Levinas und seine Hermeneutik diachronen da-seins (2020)
Die Rose der Barmherzigkeit - Ein Hauptwerk des Freiburger Münsters (2021)

References

1931 births
2022 deaths
20th-century German philosophers
21st-century German philosophers
Christian philosophers
University of Freiburg alumni
University of Augsburg alumni
Academic staff of the University of Freiburg
People from Trier